Foggin is a surname. Notable people with the surname include:

Chris Foggin (born 1985), British film director and screenwriter
Myers Foggin (1908–1986), British concert pianist and conductor